Austrotrechus is a genus of beetles in the family Carabidae, containing the following species:

 Austrotrechus contortus Moore, 1972
 Austrotrechus kosciuskoanus (Sloane, 1923)

References

Trechinae